Trichromia samos is a moth in the family Erebidae. It was described by Herbert Druce in 1896. It is found in Belize and Honduras.

References

Moths described in 1896
samos